Ventura Village is a neighborhood within the Phillips community in Minneapolis. Its boundaries are Interstate 35W to the west, Interstate 94 (including the I-94/I-35W bottleneck) to the north, and Hiawatha Avenue to the east. The southern boundary runs (from west to east) along East 22nd Street from I-35W to Chicago Avenue, along East 24th Street from Chicago Avenue to 17th Avenue South, and then back up to 22nd Street from 17th Avenue to Hiawatha Avenue (this portion is only about a block long). Franklin Avenue, which runs east-west, acts as the main commercial artery in the neighborhood.

Demographics
As of 2020, the population of Ventura Village was 7,050, split 51.0% male and 49.0% female. 5,160 are of voting age. 58.6% of residents were at least a high school graduate (or equivalent), and 14.5% had earned a bachelor's degree or higher. 

37.3% of the population were foreign-born residents, and 57.6% spoke a language other than English at home. According to the American Community Survey 5-year estimates (2016-2020), the top non-English languages spoken in Ventura Village were Spanish (spoken by 18.2% of the population), Somali (6.1%), Oromo (2.2%), Amharic (1.7%), and Vietnamese (1.3%). 34.1% of residents spoke English less than "very well".

36.1% of households had no access to a vehicle. Among workers 16 years and older, 60.0% commuted to work via car, 16.9% used public transit, and 23.0% walked, biked, worked at home, or used some other method. The medium household income in Ventura Village was $32,131. 37.9% of residents lived below the poverty line, and 9.0% were unemployed. 84.4% of housing in the neighborhood was renter-occupied.

References

External links
Minneapolis Neighborhood Profile - Ventura Village
pdf map of the Neighborhood.
Ventura Village Neighborhood Association
Phillips Neighbors Forum - Neighborhood e-mail list and forum including Ventura Village

Neighborhoods in Minneapolis